JanusVR is a corporation based in San Mateo, California, and Toronto, Ontario, that develops immersive web browsing software.  It was founded by James McCrae and Karan Singh in December 2014. Named after Janus, the Roman God of passages, JanusVR portrays web content in multi-dimensional spaces interconnected by portals.

Company

The founders of JanusVR come from the Dynamic Graphics Project, Computer Science at the University of Toronto.
Development of JanusVR began in the middle of 2013, 
with early progress documented on the Oculus VR Rift Forum, and subsequently on the janusVR subreddit. In August 2015 JanusVR joined the Boost.VC accelerator program, and raised a Seed Series round with 
Lerer Hippeau Ventures  as the lead investor in January 2016.

Products

The JanusVR platform comprises a suite of software that make it simple to create, share and experience spatially rich internet content. 
The suite includes:

 JanusVR: a standalone web authoring and browsing tool for creating spatially rich web content. All existing web content can be viewed, transformed or re-interpreted interactively within JanusVR for desktop VR hardware.
 JanusWeb: a webGL-based version of JanusVR, viewable through existing web browsers, with support for mobile VR hardware.
 Presence Server: open-source server software, forming the social and collaborative foundation of JanusVR.
 JanusVR markup + javascript: content in JanusVR builds on existing web markup and protocols, augmented by an XML like markup and javascript, to explicitly control content in space-time.
 Exporters: comprise tools to export content from popular modeling, animation and gaming software like Unity, Unreal, Blender, Maya and Sketch-up into JanusVR.
 Vesta: a free web-hosting and content-sharing community integrated with JanusVR.

References

External links
 JanusVR website
 JanusVR webGL browser
 Vesta - WebVR creation and distribution

Virtual reality companies
Software companies based in the San Francisco Bay Area
Software companies of the United States